Two ships of United States Navy have been named Acme.

 , an  that was launched on 31 May 1941.
 , a minesweeper that was launched on 23 June 1955.

References

United States Navy ship names